Bad Man of Deadwood is a 1941 American Western film directed by Joseph Kane and starring Roy Rogers.

Plot
The town of Deadwood and its businesses are controlled by Ripper and his gang of thugs. Roy and Gabby enter the town to set up a show business but are run over by Ripper and his gang. When the going gets too tough Roy and Gabby fight back to bring the gang to the law with evidence.

Cast 
 Roy Rogers as Brett Starr aka Bill Brady
 George 'Gabby' Hayes as Prof. Mortimer "Gabby" Blackstone
 Carol Adams as Linda Barrett
 Henry Brandon as Ted Carver
 Herbert Rawlinson as Judge Gary
 Sally Payne as "Princess" Sally Blackstone
 Hal Taliaferro as Henchman Ripper
 Jay Novello as Monte Burns
 Horace Murphy as Seth Belden
 Monte Blue as Sheriff Jordan
 Ralf Harolde as Jake Marvel
 Jack Kirk as Clem Littlejohn

Soundtrack 
 Roy Rogers and Sally Payne - "Joe O'Grady" (Written by Jule Styne and Sol Meyer)
 Roy Rogers - "Home on the Rangeland" (Written by Rogers and Fred Rose)
 Roy Rogers - "Song of the Dusty Trail" (Written by Fred Rose and Ray Whitley)

External links 
 
 

1941 films
1941 Western (genre) films
American black-and-white films
Republic Pictures films
American Western (genre) films
Films directed by Joseph Kane
1940s English-language films
1940s American films